Norte Litoral TV (NL TV) is a television station for the conurbation of Póvoa de Varzim and Vila do Conde to be launched June 14, 2008.

NL TV aims to be a primary local news source in the conurbation, but also aims to reach regional audiences in the neighboring cities of Esposende, Barcelos and Vila Nova de Famalicão.

Programs
Jornal Litoral — daily news
Jornal Litoral Extra  — news flash
Estádio Litoral — sports
Reportagem  — reports
Página de Polícia — crime
Gente de Quem se Fala — style
Roteiro Cultural — arts
Gente do Amanhã — children
Magazine Vila do Conde — varieties
Barcelos Aqui! — weekly
Esposende Aqui — weekly
Famalicão Aqui — weekly

References

Mass media in Póvoa de Varzim
Vila do Conde
Portuguese-language television stations
Television channels and stations established in 2008
2008 establishments in Portugal